Zell railway station is a railway station in the municipality of Zell, in the Swiss canton of Lucerne. It is an intermediate stop on the standard gauge Huttwil–Wolhusen line of BLS AG.

Services 
The following services stop at Zell:

References

External links 
 
 

Railway stations in the canton of Lucerne
BLS railway stations